Porsha Phillips (born January 13, 1988) is an American professional women's basketball player, formerly with the San Antonio Silver Stars of the Women's National Basketball Association (WNBA). Porsha Phillips finished her basketball career in Israel, playing for Ramat Hasharon Club.

Porsha Phillips played for Redan High School in her hometown of Stone Mountain, Georgia. While at Redan, Phillips averaged 18.8 points, 5.3 rebounds and 3.8 blocked shots as a senior to earn elite status as a Women’s Basketball Coaches Association (WBCA), USA Today, Parade and McDonald’s All-American. All four organizations honor the top high school players in the country.

For her career Phillips led Redan and head coach Rhonda Malone to a 104-27 record, including two state runner-up finishes. She posted 1,624 points and 837 rebounds during her career as well.

Phillips, a three-time DeKalb County Player of the Year, was ranked as the eighth overall recruit in the country by Blue Star Girls Report and 15th overall, and the second highest ranked forward by Roundball Journal.

LSU and Georgia statistics

Source

WNBA
Phillips attended Redan High School in Stone Mountain, Georgia and graduated 2006. After, she attended Louisiana State University before transferring to the University of Georgia and played for the Lady Bulldogs. Phillips was selected in the third round of the 2011 WNBA Draft (30th overall) by the San Antonio Silver Stars. Her brother is former Boston Red Sox second baseman Brandon Phillips who became the first Red Sox player to wear the number zero.

References 

1988 births
Living people
American women's basketball players
Basketball players from Georgia (U.S. state)
Georgia Lady Bulldogs basketball players
LSU Lady Tigers basketball players
McDonald's High School All-Americans
Parade High School All-Americans (girls' basketball)
People from Stone Mountain, Georgia
San Antonio Silver Stars draft picks
San Antonio Stars players
Sportspeople from DeKalb County, Georgia
Forwards (basketball)